The two essential fatty acids are omega 3 and omega 6, which are required for a good human health.  However, the effects of the ω-3 (omega-3) and ω-6 (omega-6) essential fatty acids (EFAs) are characterized by their interactions.  The interactions between these two fatty acids has a direct effect on the signaling paths and biological functions like inflammation, protein synthesis, neurotransmitters in our brain and metabolic pathways in a human body. 

Arachidonic acid (AA) is a 20-carbon ω-6 essential fatty acid. It sits at the head of the "arachidonic acid cascade" that initiates 20 different signaling paths that control a wide array of biological functions, including inflammation, cell growth and the central nervous system. Most AA in the human body is derived from dietary linoleic acid (18:2 ω-6), found in nuts, seeds, vegetable oils and animal fats.

During inflammation, two other groups of dietary essential fatty acids form cascades that compete with the arachidonic acid cascade.  EPA (20:5 ω-3) provides the most important competing cascade. EPA is ingested from oily fish, algae oil, or alpha-linolenic acid (derived from walnuts, hemp oil and flax oil). DGLA (20:3 ω-6) provides a third, less prominent cascade.  It is derived from dietary GLA (18:3 ω-6) found in borage oil.  These two parallel cascades soften the inflammatory-promoting effects of specific eicosanoids made from AA.

The diet from a century ago had much less ω-3 than the diet of early hunter-gatherers but also much less pollution than today which evokes the inflammatory response. We can also look at the ratio of ω-3 to ω-6 in comparison of their diets.  These changes have been accompanied by increased rates of many diseases – the so-called diseases of civilization – that involve inflammatory processes.  There is now very strong evidence that several of these diseases are ameliorated by increasing dietary ω-3. There is also more preliminary evidence showing that dietary ω-3 can ease symptoms in several psychiatric disorders.

Eicosanoid series nomenclature 

Eicosanoids are signaling molecules derived from the essential fatty acids (EFA); they are a major pathway by which the EFAs act in the body.  There are four classes of eicosanoid and two or three series within each class.

The plasma membranes of cells contain phospholipids, which are composed of a hydrophilic phosphate head and two hydrophobic fatty acid tails.  Some of these fatty acids are 20-carbon polyunsaturated essential fatty acids – AA, EPA or DGLA.  In response to a variety of inflammatory signals, these EFAs are cleaved out of the phospholipid and released as free fatty acids. Next, the EFA is oxygenated (by either of two pathways), then further modified, yielding the eicosanoids. Cyclooxygenase (COX) oxidation removes two C=C double bonds, leading to the TX, PG and PGI series. Lipoxygenase oxidation removes no C=C double bonds and leads to the LK.

After oxidation, the eicosanoids are further modified, making a series.  Members of a series are differentiated by a letter and are numbered by the number of double bonds, which does not change within a series.  For example, cyclooxygenase action upon AA (with 4 double bonds) leads to  the series-2 thromboxanes (TXA2, TXB2... ) each with two double bonds. Cyclooxygenase action on EPA (with 5 double bonds) leads to the series-3 thromboxanes (TXA3, TXB3... ) each with three double bonds.  There are exceptions to this pattern, some of which indicate stereochemistry (PGF2α).

Table (1) shows these sequences for AA (20:4 ω-6).  The sequences for EPA (20:5 ω-3) and DGLA (20:3 ω-6) are analogous.

All prostanoids are substituted prostanoic acids.
Cyberlipid Center's  Prostenoid page illustrates the parent compound and the rings associated with each series–letter.

The IUPAC and the IUBMB use the equivalent term Icosanoid.

Arachidonic acid cascade in inflammation 

In the arachidonic acid cascade, dietary linoleic acid (18:2 ω-6) is desaturated and elongated to form arachidonic acid (and also other omega 6), esterified into a phospholipid in the cell membrane.  Next, in response to many inflammatory stimuli, such as air pollution, smoking, second-hand smoke, hydrogenated vegetable oils and other exogenous toxins; phospholipase is generated and cleaves this phospholipid, releasing AA as a free fatty acid.  AA can then be oxygenated and then further modified to form eicosanoids – autocrine and paracrine agents that bind receptors on the cell or its neighbors to alert the immune system of the cell damage.  Alternatively, AA can diffuse into the cell nucleus and interact with transcription factors to control DNA transcription for cytokines or other hormones.

Mechanisms of ω-3 eicosanoid action 

The eicosanoids from AA generally promote inflammation.  Those from GLA (via DGLA) and from EPA are generally less inflammatory, inactive, or even anti-inflammatory.  (This generalization is qualified: an eicosanoid may be pro-inflammatory in one tissue and anti-inflammatory in another.  See discussion of PGE2 at Calder or Tilley.)

Figure (2) shows the ω-3 and -6 synthesis chains, along with the major eicosanoids from AA, EPA and DGLA.

Dietary  ω-3 and GLA counter the inflammatory effects of AA's eicosanoids in three ways – displacement, competitive inhibition and direct counteraction.

Displacement 
Dietary ω-3 decreases tissue concentrations of AA.
Animal studies show that increased  dietary ω-3  results in decreased AA in brain  and other tissue. alpha-Linolenic acid (18:3 ω-3) contributes to this by displacing linoleic acid (18:2 ω-6) from the elongase and desaturase enzymes that produce AA.  EPA inhibits phospholipase A2's release of AA from the cell membrane.  Other mechanisms involving the transport of EFAs may also play a role.

The reverse is also true – high dietary linoleic acid decreases the body's conversion of α-linolenic acid to EPA.  However, the effect is not as strong; the desaturase has a higher affinity for α-linolenic acid than it has for linoleic acid.

Competitive Inhibition 
DGLA and EPA compete with AA for access to the cyclooxygenase and lipoxygenase enzymes.  So the presence of DGLA and EPA in tissues lowers the output of AA's eicosanoids.  For example, dietary GLA increases tissue DGLA and lowers TXB2.  Likewise, EPA inhibits the production of series-2 PG and TX.  Although DGLA forms no LTs, a DGLA derivative blocks  the transformation of AA to LTs.

Counteraction 
Some DGLA and EPA derived eicosanoids counteract their AA derived counterparts.  For example, DGLA yields PGE1, which powerfully counteracts PGE2.  EPA yields the antiaggregatory prostacyclin PGI3    It also yields the leukotriene LTB5 which vitiates the action of the AA-derived LTB4.

The paradox of dietary GLA 
Dietary oxidized linoleic acid (LA, 18:2 ω-6) is inflammatory. In the body, LA is desaturated to form GLA (18:3 ω-6), yet dietary GLA is anti-inflammatory. Some observations partially explain this paradox: LA competes with α-linolenic acid, (ALA, 18:3 ω-3) for Δ6-desaturase, and thereby eventually inhibits formation of anti-inflammatory EPA (20:5 ω-3).  In contrast, GLA does not compete for Δ6-desaturase.  GLA's elongation product DGLA (20:3 ω-6) competes with 20:4 ω-3 for the Δ5-desaturase, and it might be expected that this would make GLA inflammatory, but it is not, perhaps because this step isn't rate-determining.  Δ6-desaturase does appear to be the rate-limiting step; 20:4 ω-3 does not significantly accumulate in bodily lipids.

DGLA inhibits inflammation through both competitive inhibition and direct counteraction (see above.)  Dietary GLA leads to sharply increased DGLA in the white blood cells' membranes, where LA does not.  This may reflect white blood cells' lack of desaturase.  Supplementing dietary GLA increases serum DGLA without increasing serum AA.

It is likely that some dietary GLA eventually forms AA and contributes to inflammation.  Animal studies indicate the effect is small. The empirical observation of GLA's actual effects argues that DGLA's anti-inflammatory effects dominate.

Complexity of pathways 
Eicosanoid signaling paths are complex.
It is therefore difficult to characterize the action of any particular eicosanoid.
For example, PGE2 binds four receptors, dubbed EP1–4.
Each is coded by a separate gene, and some exist in multiple isoforms.
Each EP receptor in turn couples to a G protein.
The EP2, EP4 and one isoform of the EP3 receptors couple to Gs.
This increases intracellular cAMP and is anti-inflammatory.
EP1 and other EP3 isoforms couple to Gq.
This leads to increased intracellular calcium and is pro-inflammatory.
Finally, yet another EP3 isoform couples to Gi, which both decreases cAMP and  increases calcium.
Many immune-system cells express multiple receptors that couple these apparently opposing pathways.
Presumably, EPA-derived PGE3 has a somewhat different effect of on this system, but it is not well-characterized.

The arachidonic acid cascade in the central nervous system (CNS) 

The arachidonic acid cascade proceeds somewhat differently in the brain.  Neurohormones, neuromodulators or neurotransmitters act as first messengers.  They activate phospholipids to release AA from neuron cell membranes as a free fatty acid. During its short lifespan, free AA may affect the activity of the neuron's ion channels and protein kinases.  Or it may be metabolized to form eicosanoids, epoxyeicosatrienoic acids (EETs), neuroprotectin D or various endocannabinoids (anandamide and its analogs.)

The actions of eicosanoids within the brain are not as well characterized as they are in inflammation. It is theorized that they act within the neuron as second messengers controlling presynaptic inhibition and the activation of protein kinase C.  They also act as paracrine mediators, acting across synapses to nearby cells.  Although detail on the effects of these signals is scant, (Piomelli, 2000) comments

Neurons in the CNS are organized as interconnected groups of functionally related cells (e.g., in sensory systems). A diffusible factor released from a neuron into the interstitial fluid, and able to interact with membrane receptors on adjacent cells, would be ideally used to "synchronize" the activity of an ensemble of interconnected neural cells. Furthermore, during development and in certain forms of learning, postsynaptic cells may secrete regulatory factors which diffuse back to the presynaptic component, determining its survival as an active terminal, the amplitude of its sprouting, and its efficacy in secreting neurotransmitters—a phenomenon known as retrograde regulation. The participation of arachidonic acid metabolites in retrograde signaling and in other forms of local modulation of neuronal activity has been proposed.

The EPA and DGLA cascades are also present in the brain and their eicosanoid metabolites have been detected.  The ways in which these differently affect mental and neural processes are not nearly as well characterized as are the effects in inflammation.

Further discussion 
Figure 2 shows two pathways from EPA to DHA, including the exceptional Sprecher's shunt.

5-LO acts at the fifth carbon from the carboxyl group.
Other lipoxygenases—8-LO, 12-LO and 15-LO—make other eicosanoid-like products.
To act, 5-LO uses the nuclear-membrane enzyme 5-lipoxygenase-activating protein (FLAP), first to a hydroperoxyeicosatetraenoic acid (HPETE), then to the first leukotriene, LTA.

See also 
Essential fatty acid
Omega-3 fatty acid
Omega-6 fatty acid
Ratios of Omega 3 to Omega 6 in different foods
Eicosanoid
Docosanoid

References 

Fatty acids
Eicosanoids
Docosanoids
Immune system

ca:Àcids grassos essencials#Interacció d'àcids grassos essencials